Scioto Mills is an unincorporated community in Stephenson County, Illinois.

References

Unincorporated communities in Stephenson County, Illinois
Unincorporated communities in Illinois